The posterior grey column (posterior cornu, dorsal horn, spinal dorsal horn, posterior horn, sensory horn) of the spinal cord is one of the three grey columns of the spinal cord. It receives several types of sensory information from the body, including fine touch, proprioception, and vibration.  This information is sent from receptors of the skin, bones, and joints through sensory neurons whose cell bodies lie in the dorsal root ganglion.

Anatomy
The posterior grey column is subdivided into six layers termed Rexed laminae I-VI
Marginal nucleus of spinal cord (lamina I)
Substantia gelatinosa of Rolando (lamina II)
Nucleus proprius (laminae III, IV)
Spinal lamina V, the neck of the posterior horn
Spinal lamina VI, the base of the posterior horn.

The other four Rexed laminae are located in the other two grey columns in the spinal cord.

Additional images

See also
 Posterior column-medial lemniscus pathway
 Posterior horn of lateral ventricles
 Anterior grey column

References

Spinal cord
Neuroanatomy